Beth Cavener, also known as Beth Cavener Stichter, is an American artist based out of Montana. A classically trained sculptor, her process involves building complex metal armatures to support massive amounts of clay. Cavener is best known for her fantastical animal figures, which embody the complexity of human emotion and behavior.

Cavener addresses controversial subject matter head on and in direct opposition to the reputation of her chosen medium, clay. The artist focuses her sculpture on human psychology, stripped of context and rationalization, and articulated through animal forms. As she states, "on the surface, these figures are simply feral animals suspended in a moment of tension. Beneath the surface, they embody the consequences of human fear, apathy, aggression, and misunderstanding". Her process is very physical, involving thousands of pounds clay sculpted using her whole body. Her work has earned many awards, and is exhibited in private galleries and public museums throughout the United States.

Biography
Cavener was born in 1972 in Pasadena, California. Her father is a molecular biologist, and inspired Cavener to study science up until college. She would work in his lab in the summers, and says that she aspired to a career as an academic scientist. Her mother, Nancy Jacobsohn, a sculptor and an art teacher, taught Cavener how to work with clay starting at an early age and also did some painting.
Cavener went on to pursue her studies in physics and astronomy at Haverford College in Pennsylvania. In her 3rd year, she traveled to Florence, Italy, where she attended the Cecil Academy of Art. Upon returning, Cavener suspended her studies in astrophysics in order to focus on incorporating her diverse interests with a major Fine Art. She received her BA in Sculpture in 1995.

Cavener would spend the next few years honing her artistic style and research through a series of apprenticeships and fellowships in Nashville, Tennessee and at the Charles H. Cecil Studios in Florence, Italy. Trained in the classical atelier style throughout her studies, Cavener became restless with the more traditional methods of sculpting and casting, focused exclusively on the human form. Returning to the raw material of clay, Cavener began developing a method of working solid on increasingly complex armatures that allowed her to explore more complex gestures. Cavener spent four years in Columbus, Ohio, independently developing her work and searching for a conceptual link to her interest human psychology and social structures.  Cavener enrolled in graduate school at The Ohio State University, where she received her Master's in Fine Arts degree in ceramics between 2000 and 2002. Her thesis exhibition, "tremble shiver," made the transition from working with the human figure to using human-scaled portrayals of the animal body to express human emotion and psychological portraits.

After receiving her MFA, Cavener spent two years as a resident artist at the Archie Bray Foundation for the Ceramic Arts from 2000-2002, and then completed a brief Guest Artist residency at The Clay Studio in Philadelphia, Pennsylvania in 2004. She then traveled for residencies in Jingdezhen, China (2008), La Meridiana, Certaldo, Italy (2012), and at the Shigaraki Ceramic Cultural Park in Shigaraki, Japan (2013). Cavener opened the exhibition, "The Other", in November 2017, with 5 new major pieces.

In addition to her full-time studio practice, Cavener opened a group professional studio space in 2014 under the name Studio 740 in Helena, MT. in order to mentor and support young emerging artists. She is vocal about the lack of funding for young artists, and has completed two successful crowd-funding initiatives, one in partnership with United States Artists (USA) in 2011 and another self-directed initiative using Patreon, to support the artists in residence of Studio 740.

Work

Cavener's sculptures are large and dynamic, evoking fear and anxiety that is distinctly human even though it is presented through animal forms. The body language of these animal forms are metaphors for how humans think and feel, and they act as a psychological portrait more than a physical representation. In 2008, Cavener joined the Claire Oliver Gallery, where she opened a show called "On Tender Hooks" on October 22, 2009. In 2010, she had a show entitled "The Four Humors," inspired by the ancient Greek notion of being able to characterize one's personality by which "humor" they possessed in excess. Her last show with Claire Oliver, "Come Undone," was displayed in the fall of 2012.

Her work is owned by many public collections, including the Honolulu Museum of Art, the Arizona State University Art Museum (Tempe), the Chazen Museum of Art (Madison, Wisconsin), the Museum of Fine Arts, Houston, the Northwest Museum of Arts and Culture (Spokane, Washington), the Racine Art Museum (Racine, Wisconsin), the Smithsonian American Art Museum (Washington DC), and the Tennessee State Museum (Nashville). She has promised gifts to the Metropolitan Museum of Art and the Museum of Art and Design, both in New York City, New York.

Process
Cavener's usual working method is building solid sculptures on metal armatures, often with 2,000 or more pounds of clay at a time, then cutting the piece into 30-160 sections, hollowing out each section out to 1/4" thickness, and reassembling the pieces before firing. In order to work on a larger scale, the reassembled hollow pieces are then cut again to fit inside the kiln, fired, and then reassembled with glues and epoxies.  (A slideshow of this process can be seen on her website under the  Materials and Techniques section).  She usually paints the surface with flat interior latex paint. This allows her to fill in seams after reassembly and maintain the look and feel of clay. She has also uses the technique terra sigillata
, or "sealed earth," a process in which clay is burnished to a glossy texture, which is how she achieves the luminous surface of her sculptures.

Cavener shapes her stoneware animals in unexpected, and human-like, poses. Her "A Second Kind of Loneliness" from 2009, in the collection of the Honolulu Museum of Art, is an example of this.  The hollow sculpture contains an internal mechanical breathing device that animates the pinwheel. By using this pinwheel mechanism, Cavener is able create an illusion of animation, which is why her sculptures seem to be suspended in a burst of activity. 
For "Come Undone," her 2012 show at the Claire Oliver Gallery, she explored mixed media, including handmade doilies for "The White Hind" and sugar crystals for "The Adoration." "Each piece in the show is a self-portrait representing different aspects of the artist's femininity." Stichter was quoted saying "I wanted to explore the idea of feminine sexuality and how difficult it is to express desire-passion in a woman without it being a taboo, or without it being seen as wanton."

Awards

2009          Artist Trust Individual Art Fellowship
2006          Jean Griffith Fellowship
2005          Virginia A. Groot Award, First Prize
2005          Individual Artist Fellowship, Ohio Arts Council 
2003          Emerging Artist Grant, American Craft Council

Exhibitions

Selected solo exhibitions
2017     "The Other"  Jason Jacques, New York, NY 
2012     "Come Undone"  Claire Oliver Gallery, New York, NY 
2010     "The Four Humors"  Claire Oliver Gallery, New York, NY 
2009     "On Tender Hooks"  Claire Oliver Gallery, New York, NY
2008     "Apologia"  Art Spirit Gallery, Coeur d'Alene, ID
2006     "A Modest Proposal"  Garth Clark Gallery, New York, NY
2005     "The Wildness Within"  G-Spot Gallery, NCECA, Baltimore, MD
2004     Contemporary Crafts Museum, ACC Grant Exhibition, Portland, OR
2003     "Animal Body, Human Space"  Archie Bray Foundation, Helena, MT
2002     "tremble, shiver"  MFA Exhibition, Columbus, OH
2000     Acme Art Company, Columbus, OH

Selected group exhibitions
2016     "Turn the Page: Ten Years of Hi-Fructose, The Virginia Museum of Contemporary Art, Virginia Beach, VA  - traveling exhibition

2016     "Objectify (Cultured Animal)," Belger Arts Center, Kansas City, MO

2015     "Trophies and Prey: A Contemporary Bestiary," Peters Project Space, Santa Fe, NM    
2015     "Barely Imagined Beings," Proto Gallery, Hoboken, NJ       

2014     "Barely Imagined Beings," Proto Gallery, Hoboken, NJ

2014     "The Human Condition," Chazen Museum of Art, Madison, 
2014     "Flow,"  Milwaukee Museum of Art, Milwaukee, WI     
2012-13      Animatopoeia: A Most Peculiar (Post Modern) Bestiary, The Galleries at Cleveland State University, 
Cleveland, OH
2012     10-20-10, Claire Oliver Gallery, New York, NY
2012     Sources and Influences, The Huntington Museum of Art, Huntington, WV
2012     2012 NCECA Invitational: Push Play, The Bellevue Arts Museum, Bellevue, WA
2011     Adrift, The Hyde Gallery at the Nesin Graduate Center, Memphis College of Art, Memphis, TN
2011     Jean Griffith Fellowship Fifth Anniversary Exhibition, Pottery Northwest, Seattle, WA
2010     Art Miami 2010, Claire Oliver Gallery, Miami
2007     From the Ground Up: The 2007 Renwick invitational, The Smithsonian Museum, Renwick Gallery, Washington DC
2007     Man and Beast, Garth Clark Gallery, New York, NY
2006     Sidney Myer Fund International Ceramics Award, Shepparton, Australia
2005     Dominion: Man in Nature, Cervini Haas Gallery/Gallery Materia, Scottsdale, AZ
2006     Animal Instincts, Baltimore Clayworks, Baltimore, MD
2005     fancical: Ceramic Artists and the Forms of Nature, Cresson Gallery, University of Wisconsin WI 
2005     School's Out!, NCECA 2005, Catonsville Art Gallery, Baltimore, MD
2005     Clay Menagerie, Garth Clark Gallery, New York, NY
2005     A Tale to Tell: Contemporary Narratives in Clay, John Michael Kohler Arts Center, Sheboygan, WI
2005     NCECA 2005 Exhibition, Taipei County Yingge Ceramics Museum, Taipei, Taiwan
2004     NCECA 2004 Invitational: Biomimicry: The Art of Imitating Life, Herron Gallery, Indianapolis, IN
2004     As I See Myself: autobiographical Art, Kentucky Museum of Art and Design, Louisville, KY
2004     Viewpoint: Ceramics 2004, Grossmont College, El Cajon, CA
2004     Two Artist Exhibition with Chris Anteman, The Art Spirit Gallery, Coeur d'Alene, ID
2004     Alter Egos: Voices From Inside, Ohio Art league Gallery, Columbus, OH
2003     St. Petersburg Clay National Best of Show, St. Petersburg Clay, St. Petersburg, FL
2003     Wichita National 2003, Second Place, Wichita Center for the Arts, Wichita, KS
2003     ANA 32, Holter Museum of Art, Helena, MT
2003     NCECA National, David Zapf Gallery, San Diego, CA

Publications
Garth Clark, Human, The Art of Beth Cavener, Fresco Books/ SF Design, llc., 2019
"Beth Cavener: Subliminal" by Kathleen Whitney, Ceramics Monthly Volume 63, 2015
"Come Undone: The Sculptures of Beth Cavener Stichter" by Jen Pappas, Hi-Fructose Volume 26, 2013
"Veiled Lures: The Sculptures of Beth Cavener Stichter" by J.L. Shnabel, Hi-Fructose Volume 16, 2012
"Innovation & Change: Ceramics from the Arizona State University Art Museum" by Peter Held, Arizona State University Art Museum, 2009, 
"Confrontational Ceramics" by Judith Schwartz, University of Pennsylvania Press, August 2008, 
"Clay in Art International Yearbook 06/07" by Kostas Tarkasis (ed.), Clay Art International, 2008
"A Human Impulse: Figuration from the Diane and Sandy Besser Collection" by Peter Held, Arizona State University Art Museum, 2008, 
"From the Ground Up: Renwick Craft Invitational 2007" by Jane Milosch and Suzanne Frantz, Smithsonian American Art Museum, 2007, 
"Beth Cavener Stichter" by Garth Clark, New York: Garth Clark Gallery, 2006
500 Animals in Clay: Contemporary Expressions of the Animal Form by Joe Bova, Lark Books, November 2006, 
500 Figures in Clay: Ceramic Artists Celebrate the Human Form by Veronika Alice Gunter, Lark Books, September 2004,

References

External links
 Cavener's website
 Jason Jacques Gallery - representing Beth Cavener
 ArtNet page on Cavener Stichter
 The Archie Bray Foundation
 Cavener Stichter Entry on AccessCeramics

Ohio State University alumni
Haverford College alumni
Living people
People from Whitman County, Washington
American ceramists
1972 births
Artists from Pasadena, California